Frankfort Municipal Airport  is a public airport located   west of Frankfort, in Clinton County, Indiana, United States. The airport was founded in December 1960.

Facilities and aircraft 
Frankfort Municipal Airport covers an area of 162 acres (66 ha) at an elevation of 861 feet (262 m) above mean sea level. It has two asphalt runways:
9/27 is a 5,000 by 75 feet (1,524 X 23 m) runway with approved GPS and NDB approaches, and 4/22 is a 2,527 by 70 feet (770 X 21 m) runway.

For the 12-month period ending December 31, 2019, the airport had 19,181 aircraft operations, an average of 53 per day: 97% general aviation and 3% air taxi. 
In December 2021, there were 32 aircraft based at this airport: 27 single-engine, 3 multi-engine, 1 jet and 1 helicopter.

References

External links 

Airports in Indiana
Transportation in Clinton County, Indiana
Buildings and structures in Clinton County, Indiana